Umbria was a protected cruiser of the Italian Regia Marina (Royal Navy) built in the 1890s. All of the ships were named for current or former regions of Italy. Umbria spent much of her career abroad, including several years in American waters. In service during a period of relative peace, Umbria never saw combat. In 1911, she was sold to Haiti and renamed Consul Gostrück, though she did not serve for very long under the Haitian flag. Her crew was too inexperienced to operate the ship, and she foundered shortly after being transferred to the Haitian Navy.

Design

The ships had a ram bow and a flush deck. Each vessel was fitted with a pair of pole masts. She had a crew of between 213 and 278.

Her propulsion system consisted of a pair of horizontal triple-expansion steam engines that drove two screw propellers. Steam was supplied by four cylindrical fire-tube boilers that were vented into two funnels.

Umbria was armed with a main battery of four  L/40 guns mounted singly, with two side by side forward and two side by side aft. A secondary battery of six  L/40 guns were placed between them, with three on each broadside. Close-range defense against torpedo boats consisted of one  gun, eight  guns, two  guns, and a pair of machine guns. She was also equipped with two  torpedo tubes.

Service history
Umbria was built by the Odero-Terni-Orlando shipyard in Livorno. Her keel was laid down on 1 August 1888. Shortages of funding slowed the completion of Umbria and her sister ships. Tight budgets forced the navy to reduce the pace of construction so that the funds could be used to keep the active fleet in service. As a result, her hull was not ready to be launched until 23 April 1891, and fitting-out work took another almost three years to complete. Umbria finally joined the fleet on 16 February 1894. She remained there through 1894. Later that year, Umbria and Dogali cruised off the eastern coast of South America.

In September 1904, Umbria stopped in Rio de Janeiro, Brazil, to supervise the transfer of sailors who had been killed by a yellow fever outbreak on her sister  in 1896. The men, 134 in all, had been buried in various cemeteries, but were re-interred in a large mausoleum in São Francisco Xavier. In June 1905, Umbria represented Italy at the Lewis and Clark Centennial Exposition in Portland, Oregon. She visited San Diego, California in August exchanging salutes and visits with the commander of the coastal fortification outside the city. Two days after arriving, Umbrias captain, officers, and twenty crewmen went ashore and placed a wreath to commemorate the men who had been killed aboard the United States' gunboat Bennington in a boiler explosion. Umbria ran aground outside Kingston, Jamaica in July 1906, while en route from Puerto Rico. The salvage ship  assisted in pulling the ship free.

By 1910, the Regia Marina had decided to dispose of the obsolescent cruiser. Rumors that year of a potential sale to the Ecuadorian Navy prompted Peru to buy the old French cruiser , though Ecuador did not end up purchasing Umbria. Instead, in December 1910, the Regia Marina sold Umbria to the Haitian Navy, but she did not arrive in Port-de-Paix, Haiti, until 13 June 1911. After the sale, the ship was renamed Consul Gostrück. The ship was rumored to be carrying Cipriano Castro, the deposed president of Venezuela, though they later proved to be false. A German captain, Willy Meyer, was hired to take command of the ship upon her arrival in Haiti, but due to the lengthy delays, he quit. The cruiser sank shortly after entering service because her crew was not experienced in handling the ship. Consul Gostrück was eventually raised and towed to Rotterdam, the Netherlands, for disposal in 1913.

Notes

References

External links
 Umbria Marina Militare website 

Regioni-class cruisers
Ships built in Livorno
1891 ships